Toxyn (Ruth Mastorakis) is a fictional character, a superhero in the Marvel Universe, member of the Strikeforce: Morituri. The character was created by Peter B. Gillis and Brent Anderson.

Publication history
Toxyn was created by writer Peter B. Gillis and artist Brent Anderson. She made her first cameo appearance, standing in the shadows, in the finale of Strikeforce: Morituri #5 (April 1987). She made her first full appearance in issue #6 and joined the Strikeforce: Morituri in issue #8, as part of the second-generation Morituri. She was a regular cast member until her death in issue #21. Judging from her surname and her relation to a man named "Nikos", the character appears to be at least partially of Greek origin.

Fictional character biography
In 2073, Ruth Mastorakis was an ordinary young woman, about to marry her boyfriend, a man named Nikos. For reasons unrevealed, Nikos professed he could not and should not marry her, later claiming that "you know what I am. I can't marry you!" Furthermore, Nikos beat and humiliated her in front of everybody.

Devastated after her breakup, Ruth sought something entirely different in her life. Possibly out of desperation, she decided to enlist to the Morituri program, which granted superhuman powers to its recipients, in exchange of their participating in the ongoing war against the destructive alien race known as the Horde. However, the process has a fatal side-effect: the recipient dies within a year of receiving it, after catastrophically rejecting it. Ruth was genetically compatible for the process and underwent, eventually developing the ability to analyze the biochemistry of others and synthesize poisons and their antidotes that could accordingly tackle her opponents. The nature of her powers also led her into assuming the codename "Toxyn".

Sometime later, Toxyn, together with Scaredycat and Scatterbrain, officially debuted in the media as the second generation of Morituri and met with their veteran teammates. Subsequently, Toxyn had her first official mission with the team, in San Francisco. During the course of that mission, senior member Radian, looking for a leader figure after the demise of group leader, Vyking, mistook Toxyn's self-confidence for experience and pressured her into making battle decisions, until she discouraged him from further pressing her into this position. Nevertheless, Toxyn's contribution to that battle was instrumental.

Later, having watched her achievements through the media, her ex-boyfriend, Nikos, contacted her, wishing to congratulate her. Toxyn was startled and angry that he considered congratulating her, after what he had done to her. Around the same time, the Morituri stood accused by the ruling Paedia Council of breaking regulations and going against the Horde without authorization on a particular occasion. While speaking with a Paedia official, an indignant Toxyn kissed all her teammates and secreted a deadly poison on their lips, wanting to demonstrate to her superiors the desperation the Morituri feel for every moment they are being unfairly kept away from active duty, given the short time they have left on Earth. The Council was convinced by her point and no reprimands were issued. Toxyn then administered the antidote to all her teammates.

Death
Toxyn went through many adventures with the team and eventually found herself the most veteran member of the team still active and alive (with the exception of comatose Scatterbrain). While raiding a Horde ship in orbit, the team rescued a Paedia soldier, Jason Edwards, who had been kept slave by the Horde. Jason and Toxyn flirted and when they returned to Earth, they kissed and agreed to arrange a date. Toxyn was then taken away on an ambulance by paramedics, having sustained a leg injury during the battle. However, just then, the deadly Morituri effect caught up with her and she pushed the paramedics away, proclaiming her love towards Jason. She then pushed the ambulance into a warehouse, where she exploded into oblivion without being seen.

Powers and abilities
Toxyn had the ability to analyze a person's biochemistry, through physical touch, and synthesize and secrete the whole spectrum of poisons, including their antidotes. She could produce both beneficial and harmful biochemical agents that affected both living and inanimate matter, although she needed skin-to-skin contact to produce a species specific toxin. Toxyn often kissed her opponents in battle, thus ensuring the effectiveness of her poisons, often paralyzing or instantly killing her adversaries. As a by-product of her exposure to the Morituri program, she also had enhanced strength and resilience. Like all other team members, she also wore special boots which enabled her to fly.

References

Comics characters introduced in 1987
Marvel Comics characters with superhuman strength
Marvel Comics female superheroes
Marvel Comics superheroes
Strikeforce: Morituri